Class 710 may refer to:

British Rail Class 710
GSR Class 710
South Australian Railways 710 class